Peter Maxwell (23 January 1921 – 5 April 2013) born as Peter Magitai, was a British, and later Australian director and screenwriter of television and film.

Biography
He was born in Vienna, Austria, to newspaper journalist Leo Magatai and wife Johanna, his family fled Vienna in the 1930s, and he changed his surname to enter the British Army, and after having been posted to India, returned to Britain to work as an assistant director to Alexander Korda in 1949, he worked briefly in Australia in the early 1960s, before returning to England. 
 
In 1967 he emigrated to Australia permanently, where he directed such films as Country Town and television series including Bellbird, Rip Tide and A Country Practice.

Selected filmography
 Blind Spot (1958)
 The Desperate Man (1959)
 The Ghost Train Murder (1959)
 The Long Shadow (1961)
 Serena (1962)
 Dilemma (1962)
 Impact (1963)
 The Switch (1963)
 Country Town (1971)
 Boney (1972 – 1st series: 7 eps. 1973 – 2nd series: 4 eps)
 Polly Me Love (1976)
 Plunge Into Darkness (1977)
 Bailey's Bird (1979) (TV series)
 Touch and Go (1980)
 The Coast Town Kids (1980)
The Mystery at Castle House (1982)
Platypus Cove (1983)

References

External links
 

1921 births
British film directors
2013 deaths
Austrian emigrants to the United Kingdom
British people in colonial India
British Army personnel
British emigrants to Australia